Lamitta Frangieh (born 15 November 1980) is a Lebanese actress, former beauty pageant contestant and fashion model.

Beauty pageants and modeling
She claimed first runner-up at Miss Lebanon 2004 Competition held at the LBC studios in Adma, Lebanon. Despite receiving the highest scores from nine independent jury members, she was only rewarded the position of first runner-up. She received the highest score in Swimwear, with a score of 9.882. Frangieh was voted as the most likely contestant to win the Miss Lebanon 2004 pageant, with local media on her side. However, due to political and religious interferences, she finished first runner-up then proceeded to Miss World 2005 pageant, where she placed in the Top 12.
She started her modeling career at the age of 13. She was the youngest model in this field in Lebanon. Her modeling career reached its summit in July 2005 when she modeled for Robert Abi Nader in Paris with famous super models, She has also been featured in major catwalks, magazines and photo-shoots around the world.she worked with 2 big magazines for 3 years as a fashion art director (Hia and al Rajol Magazine), she represented many episodes about tourism in Lebanon, called Shou fi bi Libnan.

Acting
In her acting career, she has filmed various movies and series, her start was with Lebanese series called 3asser el harim. In 2009, she moved to Egypt, where she was acting in various movies, Had Same' Haga with Ramez Galal, Mohtaram Ella Rob''' with Mohammad Ragab, 365 days of happiness with Ahmad Ezz, Ana badi3 ya Wadi3, Omar w Salma'' 3 with Tamer Hosny.

Personal life
In 2014, Lamita Franjieh married Lebanese businessman Freddy Makhraz in a private ceremony in Paris. They spent their honeymoon in Monaco and Thailand. She gave birth to their child, a son called Justin (b. 2016) at an American hospital in Carmel-by-the-Sea, California.

References

Living people
Lebanese beauty pageant winners
Lebanese film actresses
People from Zgharta
Miss World 2005 delegates
Lebanese female models
1980 births
Lamitta
Lebanese television actresses
Lebanese socialites
Lebanese Christians